Chillington is a village in the Stokenham civil parish of South Hams in Devon, England, with a population of 877 as of the 2011 Census. It is located within the South Devon AONB, with a local economy which mainly serves residents, although it also has a healthcare centre which serves the surrounding area.

References

External links
 Stokenham Parish Homepage

Villages in South Hams
Stokenham